Chester Cone is the ice-free peak rising to 188 m in the central part of Byers Peninsula, Livingston Island in the South Shetland Islands, Antarctica surmounting Midge Lake to the northwest.

The peak is named after the American Captain Chester whose sealing ship Essex visited the South Shetland Islands in 1821–22.

Location

Maps
 Península Byers, Isla Livingston. Mapa topográfico a escala 1:25000. Madrid: Servicio Geográfico del Ejército, 1992. (Map image on p. 55 of the linked study)
 L.L. Ivanov et al. Antarctica: Livingston Island and Greenwich Island, South Shetland Islands. Scale 1:100000 topographic map. Sofia: Antarctic Place-names Commission of Bulgaria, 2005.
 L.L. Ivanov. Antarctica: Livingston Island and Greenwich, Robert, Snow and Smith Islands. Scale 1:120000 topographic map.  Troyan: Manfred Wörner Foundation, 2009.

References
 SCAR Composite Antarctic Gazetteer.

Hills of Livingston Island